Pierrette Robitaille C.M. (born June 6, 1950) is a Canadian film and television actress from Quebec.

Career 
Robitaille is a two-time Genie Award nominee for Best Actress, for her role as Mme Therrien in It's Your Turn, Laura Cadieux (C't'à ton tour, Laura Cadieux) and its sequel Laura Cadieux II (Laura Cadieux...la suite), and a Jutra Award winner for Best Actress for her performance as Vic in Vic et flo ont vu un ours.

Her other credits have included the films Mambo Italiano, Intimate Power (Pouvoir intime), Poverty and Other Delights (Joyeux calvaire), Wedding Night (Nuit de noces), A Sense of Humour (Le sens de l'humour), Alice's Odyssey (L'Odyssée d'Alice Tremblay) and Séraphin: Heart of Stone (Séraphin: un homme et son péché).

Robitaille was appointed a member of the Order of Canada in 2011.

Filmography

Film

Television

References

External links

Members of the Order of Canada
1950 births
Canadian film actresses
Canadian television actresses
Actresses from Quebec
Living people
Best Actress Jutra and Iris Award winners
20th-century Canadian actresses
21st-century Canadian actresses